Jean-Martin is a French masculine given name. It may refer to:
 Jean-Martin Aussant, Canadian politician
 Jean-Martin Charcot (1825–1893), French neurologist
 Jean-Martin de Prades (c. 1720–1782), French Catholic theologian
 Jean-Martin Folz (born 1947), French businessman
 Jean-Martin Mbemba (born 1942), Congolese politician and lawyer
 Jean-Martin Moye (1730–1793), French Roman Catholic priest and missionary

See also
 Jean (male given name)
 Martin (name)

French masculine given names
Compound given names